Titanio pulchra is a moth in the family Crambidae. It was described by Rebel in 1902. It is found in Transcaspia.

References

Moths described in 1902
Odontiini
Taxa named by Hans Rebel